The Balkans is a peninsular region of southeastern Europe.

Balkan may also refer to:

Places 
 Balkan Mountains, a mountain range in Serbia and Bulgaria, in the eastern part of the Balkan Peninsula, also called Stara Planina
 Balkan Province, one of the Welayat (provinces) of Turkmenistan
 Balkan (village), a village in Stambolovo Municipality, Bulgaria
 Balkan, Kentucky, a community in the US

People
 Balkan (name)

The arts 
 Balkan (band), a defunct hard-rock band from former Yugoslavia
 Balkans (band), a rock band from Atlanta, Georgia, US
 Balkan (album), an album by Seka Aleksić
 "Balkan", a song by Scale the Summit from the album The Collective

Organizations
 Balkan Bulgarian Airlines (1947–2002), a defunct Bulgarian government-owned airline
 Balkan Universities Network, a regional university association
 FBK Balkan, a Swedish football club
 FC Balkan, a Turkmen football club
 FK Balkan Skopje, a Macedonian football club
 PFC Balkan Botevgrad, a Bulgarian football club

Other uses 
 Balkan (ship) ship of the compagnie Fraissinet, sunk August 1918
 Balkan (newspaper), a newspaper published in Balkanabat, Turkmenistan
 Balkan (motorcycle), the first motorcycle built in Bulgaria
 Balkan sprachbund, a linguistic concept
 Balkanization, a geopolitical term

See also 
 
 
 Balka (disambiguation)
 FK Balkan (disambiguation)

Turkish-language surnames